Hypocisseis is a genus of beetles in the family Buprestidae, containing the following species:

 Hypocisseis auriceps (Deyrolle, 1864)
 Hypocisseis blackburni (Obenberger, 1924)
 Hypocisseis brachyformis (Deyrolle, 1864)
 Hypocisseis carteri (Obenberger, 1924)
 Hypocisseis cyanura (Kerremans, 1898)
 Hypocisseis latipennis (Macleay, 1872)
 Hypocisseis madari (Obenberger, 1924)
 Hypocisseis nigrosericea (Obenberger, 1924)
 Hypocisseis obesa (Kerremans, 1900)
 Hypocisseis ornata Carter, 1923
 Hypocisseis papuana (Oberberger, 1924)
 Hypocisseis philippinensis Bellamy, 1991
 Hypocisseis pilosicollis (Blackburn, 1891)
 Hypocisseis suturalis (Saunders, 1868)

References

Buprestidae genera